Lam Bun (25 September 1929 – 25 August 1967) was a radio commentator at Commercial Radio Hong Kong who was fiercely critical of leftists. He was assassinated during the 1967 Hong Kong riots, becoming an icon of freedom of speech in Hong Kong.

Biography
Lam was born Lam Siu-po in 1929.

In the 1960s he worked as a radio commentator at Commercial Radio Hong Kong, which was fiercely critical of leftists. During the 1967 riots, Lam criticised the leftist rioters on his own radio programmes. He created a programme called "Can't Stop Striking" to satirise the leftists, leading some leftist newspapers at the time to label him as a "traitor" and an "imperialist running dog".

Death
On 24 August 1967, while Lam was en route to work, men posing as road maintenance workers stopped his vehicle at the end of the street where he lived. They blocked his car doors and doused Lam and his cousin with petrol. They were both then set on fire and burned alive. Lam died later that day in a hospital; his cousin died several days later. A leftist group reportedly claimed responsibility for the assassination.

No one was ever arrested, although it was believed that Yeung Kwong, then chairman of the Federation of Trade Unions (FTU) and director of the Anti-British Struggle Committee, ordered the murder. However, pro-Beijing politicians said in 2010 that leftists should not be blamed for Lam's death. The founder of Commercial Radio Hong Kong George Ho launched the programme 18/F, Block C in his memory.

Immediately after Lam Bun's death, most of the Chinese and English newspapers in Hong Kong condemned the killing as despicable and inhuman. On the other hand, the pro-communist leftist newspaper, Ta Kung Pao, published several articles, condemning Lam Bun but not the murderers. For example, one of the articles titled "", which may be translated into English as "An underground special tactic unit had crushed the villain. The antagonist, Lam Bun, was seriously wounded". Another article in the same newspaper published on the same day described the brutal murdering as a punishment that Lam Bun had deserved ("").

The Lam Bun assassination angered the people of Hong Kong, eventually leading the government of Hong Kong to suppress the riots. Lam became an icon of free speech. The police offered a reward of HK$50,000, on top of which his employers added HK$100,000, making it the highest reward ever posted in the colony.

2001 GBM controversy
In 2001, Yeung Kwong was awarded the highest honour Grand Bauhinia Medal by Tung Chee-hwa. Critics in Hong Kong felt that it was inappropriate to award a riot leader who encouraged the violence which led to Lam's murder.

2010 Commercial Radio controversy 
In May 2010, after the pro-Beijing Democratic Alliance for the Betterment of Hong Kong had sponsored a political radio programme on Commercial Radio, pro-democracy activists protested outside the station with images of Lam, complaining that the station had desecrated the memory of Lam, and all the station had stood for. Activists said they had requested an interview to talk about Lam's death. The station later said it respected freedom of speech; the DAB said the shows were about livelihood issues, and denied they promoted a political stance.

Two DAB lawmakers stepped into the row: Chan Kam-lam said: "During the '67 riots, it was not just Lam Bun who died. There were very many ordinary citizens who, we don't know for what reason, died ..." Wong Ting-kwong also said leftists should not be held responsible. Pro-democracy lawmaker Lee Cheuk-yan said the DAB were revisionists who "would rather people not talk about their inglorious past." Wong later clarified his comments, saying he had been misunderstood because the phrase 'leftist camp' had different definitions. He said that there was no evidence that Yeung Kwong or the FTU killed Lam Bun. He blamed the media for sensationalising his comments ahead of the 16 May by-election.

See also
List of unsolved murders

References

1929 births
1960s murders in Hong Kong
1967 crimes in Hong Kong
1967 deaths
1967 murders in Asia
Assassinated activists
Assassinated Chinese journalists
Assassinated Hong Kong people
Chinese anti-communists
Deaths from fire
Hong Kong journalists
Hong Kong radio presenters
Male murder victims
People murdered in Hong Kong
Radio controversies
Unsolved murders in China